Abhidnya Bhave (born March 13, 1989) is an Indian actress, who acts in Marathi television and film. She made her debut in 2013 with Lagori - Maitri Returns. She portrayed her role in Khulta Kali Khulena as Monika in 2016. She was seen in Tula Pahate Re as Mayra. Currently, she is appearing in Tu Tevha Tashi as Pushpavalli.

Early life

Abhidnya Bhave was born in Vasai-Virar in India on March 13, 1989. Her mother is a school teacher Hemangi Bhave. Her father is Uday Bhave. As a child, she lived in Mumbai.

Personal life

Abhidnya Bhave is married to her longtime boyfriend Mehul Pai, who is an entrepreneur.

Career
Abhidnya Bhave has worked in the Marathi serial Khulta Kali Khulena on Zee Marathi where she played a negative and has also worked in serial Lagori-Maitri Returns (Star Pravah). She has also worked in a Web series "Moving Out". Bhave worked with Zee Marathi's TV Show "Tula Pahate Re" starring Subodh Bhave & Gayatri Datar. Bhave co-owns a fashion brand with Tejaswini Pandit named Tejadnya. She was also seen in a Colors TV sitcom Bawara Dil starring Aditya Redij and Kinjal Dhamecha where she made a cameo appearance.

Television

Filmography

References

External links 

Marathi actors
1989 births
Living people
Indian film actresses
Indian television actresses
21st-century Indian actresses